A list of films produced by the Marathi language film industry based in Maharashtra in the year 1931.

1931 Releases
A list of Marathi films released in 1931.

References

External links
Gomolo - 

Lists of 1931 films by country or language
1931
1931 in Indian cinema